Baby I'm Back may refer to:
 Baby, I'm Back, a 1978 American sitcom
 Baby I'm Back (album), an album by James "J.T." Taylor
 "Baby I'm Back", charting single by James "J.T." Taylor from Baby I'm Back (album) 
 "Baby I'm Back" (song), a single by Baby Bash featuring Akon